International Journal of Diabetes in Developing Countries is a peer-reviewed open-access journal published on behalf of the Research Society for the Study of Diabetes in India. The journal was established in 1981 as the Diabetes Bulletin by the founding editor M. M. S. Ahuja. The journal publishes articles on the subject of experimental and clinical aspects of diabetes and its complications.

The journal is abstracted and indexed in Academic OneFile, CAB Abstracts, EBSCO Databases, Global Health, Health Reference Center Academic, Science Citation Index Expanded, and Scopus.

External links 
 

Open access journals
Quarterly journals
English-language journals
Publications established in 1981
Endocrinology journals
Springer Science+Business Media academic journals